The New Democracy, abbreviated to ND, is a political party in Slovakia, currently out of the parliament. It split out from the People's Party – Movement for a Democratic Slovakia and its current leader is Tibor Mikuš, chairman of the Trnava self-governing region. It was registered at Interior ministry of Slovakia by 12 January 2009. Establishing assembly was held on 28 March 2009.

External links 
 Official page (Slovak)
 ND in register of parties by IM SR (Slovak)

Political parties in Slovakia
National conservative parties